Annabelle Gurwitch (born November 4, 1961) is an American author, comedic actress, television host most recognizable from her stint as hostess on Dinner and a Movie on TBS, and activist associated with environmental issues and secular humanism.

Early life
Gurwitch was born to a Jewish family in Mobile, Alabama, and grew up in Florida, graduating from Miami Beach High School in 1980. While there, she took acting classes with Jay W. Jensen. After high school, she attended The Experimental Theatre Wing at New York University.

Career 
Gurwitch began working as an actress Off-Broadway in New York City, including productions with Theater for a Young Audience at Henry Street Settlement, The Public Theater, the 20th Anniversary production of Uncommon Women and Others at Lucille Lortel. Her first long-running television role was as Gina Daniels on The Guiding Light in the mid 1980s.

Gurwitch's theater credits include: The World Premiere of Donald Margulies' A Coney Island Christmas at The Geffen Playhouse, the West Coast Premiere of Go Back to Where You Are by David Greenspan at The Odyssey, the West Coast premier of Women in Jeopardy at EST Santa Barbara, productions with LA Theaterworks including Sixteen Wounded with Omar Metwally, Our Lady of 121 Street opposite Laurence Fishburn and Adam's Rib with Adam Arkin.

Her performance, off Broadway at the Joe Quintero Theater, in the title role of Murray Mednick's Joe and Betty garnered her a place in The New York Times "Top Ten Performances in Theatre of the Year 2002." She also appeared in the Los Angeles Times "Top Ten Performances of the Year in Theatre 2001."

She developed her solo show based on I See You Made an Effort, in workshops at the All for One Solo Fest, NY and Skylight Theater, Los Angeles, in 2017. It was featured in the subscription offerings at The Scottsdale Center of Performing Arts and The Temple Theater, at The Des Moines Performing Arts Center, amongst other touring locations. Her live appearances include: The Moth, Joe's Pub, House of Speakeasy, New York Comedy Festival, and the Thurber Spring Lecture Series.

Television projects
Gurwitch co-wrote two episodes of the 1980s children's animated series ThunderCats. Gurwitch and Paul Gilmartin were the original hosts of the TBS show Dinner and a Movie, which combined cooking instruction with the viewing of a feature film. Gurwitch served as co-host for six years, departing in 2002.

Other television hosting work included stints on Not Necessarily the News, Syfy's The Dream Team with Annabelle and Michael, VH1's Best Of..., series, Style Network's You're Invited, and Dot Comedy. She was the host of Wa$ted! on Planet Green for three seasons.

Gurwitch has appeared on TV series including  Miami Vice, 'Dexter, The Cleaner,  Medium, State of Mind, The Minor Accomplishments of Jackie Woodman, Seinfeld and Boston Legal.

Film projects
In 2002 Gurwitch appeared as the host of Meow TV, along with her cat Stinky, a show distributed on CD inside bags of Meow Mix. Meow TV presented itself as "Television By Cats, For Cats."

In 2007 Gurwitch wrote, produced, directed, and appeared in the documentary film Fired!. It documents the experiences of twenty-five people, including Gurwitch, who were fired from various jobs.  They recount their firings through interviews, skits, comedy routines, and filmed excerpts from the previously produced stage play of the same title. David Cross, Jeff Garlin, Bob Odenkirk and Anne Meara were all featured in addition to UAW workers, former US Secretary of Labor Bob Reich, economist Ben Stein and many other job seekers.  The film was played at the US Department of Labor and labor film festivals around the country including the DC Labor FilmFest.

Gurwitch's other films include Melvin Goes to Dinner and The Shaggy Dog.

Literary projects

She is the author of five books, most recently, You're Leaving When? which was published in March 2021. 
In April 2017, Gurwitch published Wherever You Go, There They Are: Stories About My Family You Might Relate To.

I See You Made an Effort, published in 2014, was a New York Times bestseller and Thurber Prize for American Humor Writing finalist. The year Gurwitch was a finalist for the Thurber Prize marked the first time the three finalists were all female. Gurwitch adapted this book as a solo show, first produced at the Skylight Theater and then toured nationally in 2017; Included in this book is Autumn Leaves, a 2012 ebook Gurwitch published with Zola Books that recounts an erotic fantasy she once had about one of the staff members at an Apple Genius Bar.

Gurwitch once worked for Woody Allen, but was fired during an encounter in which he said that she looked "retarded" among other insults. In 2006 she published a book of essays inspired by that dismissal called Fired!: Tales of the Canned, Canceled, Downsized, and Dismissed which subsequently became the Fired! documentary film.

Gurwitch and then-husband Jeff Kahn signed a six-figure deal with Crown to publish a memoir called You Say Tomato, I Say Shut Up. The two adapted the book into a theatrical production, in association with Off-Broadway Booking.

Essays
Her essays and satire have been published in The New Yorker - Shouts & Murmurs (Please Unsubscribe]), The New York Times (Death Without Dignity]), Wall Street Journal (After 'Wonder Woman,' Let's Cast More Women in Bit Parts Too], The Los Angeles Times (Annabelle Gurwitch on family — the one you're born with, and the one on your book cover), McSweeney's (Book Publicity in the Age of Trump), O Magazine (The Conversation You Need to Have with Anyone You Love), Time.com (I Was My Mother's Drug Mule), and Lena Dunham's Lenny Newsletter, amongst other publications. She was a regular commentator for NPR's All Things Considered and Day to Day on KPCC. She frequently makes appearances on NPR including on The Moth, Ask Me Another and Marketplace.

Gurwitch is a contributing writer for NPR's Day to Day, The Los Angeles Times Magazine, The Nation, and the website Freshyarn.com. She has written for Child, Publishers Weekly, Marie Claire, More, Men's Health, Glamour, Cooking Light, Premiere, Penthouse and Los Angeles Magazine.

Her essays have appeared in two anthologies: Note to Self: 30 Women on Hardship, Humiliation, Heartbreak, and Overcoming It All and Rejected: Tales of the Failed, Dumped, and Canceled.

Personal life
Gurwitch has one child and lives in Los Angeles. She has written and given talks on how her southern Jewish roots have influenced her family life. On November 14, 2020, the New York Times published her opinion piece "The Coronavirus Saved My Life", describing how she went in for a coronavirus test and came out with a stage 4 metastatic lung cancer diagnosis.

BibliographyFired! : tales of the canned, canceled, downsized and dismissed, New York: Touchstone, 2006. , You say tomato, I say shut up : a love story, New York: Crown Publishers, 2010. , I see you made an effort : compliments, indignities, and survival stories from the edge of 50, New York : Blue Rider Press, 2014. , Wherever You Go, There They Are: stories about my family you might relate to. Penguin Books, 2018. , You're Leaving When?: Adventures in Downward Mobility'', Counterpoint Press, 2021.

References

External links

1961 births
Actresses from Alabama
Actresses from Florida
American film actresses
Jewish American actresses
American film producers
American women screenwriters
American television actresses
Living people
American memoirists
American women memoirists
20th-century American non-fiction writers
21st-century American non-fiction writers
20th-century American actresses
21st-century American actresses
Screenwriters from Florida
Screenwriters from Alabama
American women film producers
20th-century American women writers
21st-century American women writers
21st-century American Jews